Shajrah or Shujrah are a tribe found in the provinces of Sindh and Punjab in Pakistan. They are found mainly in the districts of Khanewal, Multan and Rajanpur in Punjab, It's also estimated that Shajrahs or Shujrahs are found in Shikarpur and in Karachi as well. The Shajrha or Shujrah clan is basically from "yemen"  they migrated with Mohammad Bin Qasim some settled in Punjab speak Seraiki, while those settled in Sindh speak Sindhi in Yemen there are more than 40,000 shajrahs who speak Arabic. in Pakistan there clan  also have a political background in sindh.

References 

Saraiki tribes
Sindhi tribes